Gustavo René Ramírez López (born 9 January 1984 in Asunción, Paraguay), known as Gustavo Ramírez, is a Paraguayan footballer currently playing for 12 de Octubre of the Division Intermedia in Paraguay. He once scored a goal in 4 seconds to open a contest which is the fastest goal in Mexican soccer history.

Teams
  General Caballero (Zeballos Cue) 1999
  1º de Marzo 2000
  Libertad 2001–2002
  Sportivo Trinidense 2003
  Fernando de la Mora 2004–2006
  3 de Febrero 2007
  O'Higgins 2008
  Sol de América 2008
  12 de Octubre 2009–present

Notes

External links
 
 

1984 births
Living people
Paraguayan footballers
Paraguayan expatriate footballers
Club Libertad footballers
12 de Octubre Football Club players
Club Sol de América footballers
Sportivo Trinidense footballers
General Caballero Sport Club footballers
O'Higgins F.C. footballers
Expatriate footballers in Chile
Association football forwards